The Winnsboro Municipal Airport/Frank M. White Memorial Airport  is located near Winnsboro, Texas and is a municipally operated airport in the northeast area of Wood County, Texas.

Infrastructure
The airport has a single asphalt runway, 1/19, with dimensions .

References

External links
 

Airports in Texas
Transportation in Franklin County, Texas
Transportation in Wood County, Texas